Donald Scott Anderson (born February 13, 1951) is a former American football center in the National Football League (NFL) who played for the Minnesota Vikings. He played college football at University of Missouri.

References 

1951 births
Living people
American football centers
Players of American football from Illinois
Missouri Tigers football players
Minnesota Vikings players